Rear Admiral Charles Frederick Harris CB (2 January 1887 – 2 March 1957) was Flag Officer commanding the Reserve Fleet.

Naval career
Harris was commissioned as a sub-lieutenant in the Royal Navy on 30 August 1906. He served as a lieutenant-commander in World War I. He became Director, Naval Air Division in 1934 and then served in World War II, initially as Flag Officer in command of the shore establishment HMS Badger and then as Flag Officer commanding the Reserve Fleet from 1944 before retiring in 1945. He was appointed a Companion of the Order of the Bath on 1 January 1945.

References

1887 births
1957 deaths
Companions of the Order of the Bath
Royal Navy admirals of World War II
Military personnel from Kent